The 2013–14 Football League is the second division of the Greek professional football system and the fourth season under the name Football League after previously being known as Beta Ethniki. This is the first season after 1982–83 that the league has more than one groups. The groups are created based on geographical criteria.

North Group
In the north group, as well as in the south group, the bottom three teams are relegated. None of the teams will be promoted directly. The top four teams of each group will qualify to a playoff round, to determine the three teams which will be promoted to Super League.

Teams

 Since AEK Athens, Panserraikos, AEL were relegated to Football League 2 and Kerkyra with Kassiopi were merged, the teams became 24 and Vataniakos, Zakynthos, Paniliakos and Glyfada had to get promoted in order to fill the empty spots in Football League.

League table

Matches

South Group
The same rules to the North Group apply.

Teams

 Since AEK Athens, Panserraikos, Larissa were relegated to Football League 2 and Kerkyra with Kassiopi were merged, the teams became 24 and Vataniakos, Zakynthos, Paniliakos and Glyfada had to get promoted in order to fill the empty spots in Football League.

League table

Matches

Promotion Playoffs

Matches

Season statistics

Top scorers

References

Second level Greek football league seasons
Greece
2